The Macrobians (Μακροβίοι) were an ancient Somali Proto-Somali tribal kingdom positioned in the Horn of Africa mentioned by Herodotus.  It is one of the legendary peoples postulated at the extremity of the known world (from the perspective of the Greeks), in this case in the extreme south contrasting with the Hyperboreans in the extreme east.

Accounts 
According to Herodotus' account, the Persian Emperor Cambyses II upon his  conquest of Egypt (525 BC) sent ambassadors to Macrobia, bringing luxury gifts for the Macrobian king to entice his submission. The Macrobian ruler, who was elected based at least in part on stature, replied instead with a challenge for his Persian counterpart in the form of an unstrung bow: if the Persians could manage to string it, they would have the right to invade his country; but until then, they should thank the gods that the Macrobians never decided to invade their empire.

Culture 
Herodotus detailed how the Macrobians practiced an elaborate form of embalming. The Macrobians preserved the bodies of the dead by first extracting moisture from the corpses, then overlaying the bodies with a type of plaster, and finally decorating the exterior in vivid colors in order to imitate the deceased as realistically as possible. They then placed the body in a hollow crystal pillar, which they kept in their homes for a period of about a year. This is described by Herodotus in the following quote:

People
In the fifth Century BC, the Greek historian Herodotus, known as the father of History in western traditions, referred to a race called the Macrobians who dwelled in present-day Somaliland. These people were famous for their longevity (an average age of 120 years) due to their diet which mainly comprises meat and milk. They were also, according to Herodotus, the "tallest and most handsome among all men". They were fierce warrior herders and wealthy seafarers according to Herodotus again. All descriptions of the people agree with the pastoral Somali figures who are tall, handsome warriors, with a diet mainly consisting of meat and milk. Somalis also have a rich maritime culture. This point of view was affirmed by the Indian scholar, Mamta Agarwal, who wrote "these people were none other than the inhabitants of Somalia, opposite the Red Sea.

See also 

 Greco-Roman ethnography
 History of Djibouti
 History of Somalia
 History of Somaliland
 History of Eritrea
 Proto-Somalis
 Somalis
 Aithiopia
 Ancient Libya
 Sigelwara Land
 Fountain of Youth
 Kingdom of Kush

References 

Longevity myths
Tribes described primarily by Herodotus
Legendary tribes in Greco-Roman historiography
Ancient Africa
Ancient peoples of Africa
Cambyses II